Leighton is a city in Mahaska County, Iowa, United States.  The population was 158 in the 2020 census, an increase from 153 in the 2000 census.

Geography
Leighton's longitude and latitude coordinates in decimal form are 41.338530, -92.786800.

Demographics

2010 census
At the 2010 census there were 162 people, 65 households, and 48 families living in the city. The racial makeup of the city was 99.4% White and 0.6% from two or more races.
Of the 65 households, 29.2% had children under the age of 18 living with them, 72.3% were married couples living together, 1.5% had a male householder with no wife present, and 26.2% were non-families. 24.6% of households were one person, and 12.3% were one person aged 65 or older. The average household size was 2.49 and the average family size was 2.98.

The median age was 42 years. 25.9% of residents were under the age of 18; 5.6% were between the ages of 18 and 24; 27.2% were from 25 to 44; 18.5% were from 45 to 64; and 22.8% were 65 or older. The gender makeup of the city was 53.7% male and 46.3% female.

2000 census
At the 2000 census there were 153 people, 56 households, and 43 families living in the city. The racial makeup of the city  was 100.00% White, 0.00% African American, 0.00% Native American, 0.00% Asian, 0.00% Pacific Islander, 0.00% from other races, and 0.00% from two or more races.  0.00% of the population were Hispanic or Latino of any race.
There were 56 households; 33.9%  had children under the age of 18 living with them, 75.0%  were married couples living together, 0.0%  had a female householder with no husband present, and 23.2%  were non-families. 23.2%  of all households were made up of individuals, and 16.1%  had someone living alone who was 65 or older. The average household size was 2.73 and the average family size was 3.21.

The age distribution was 31.4%  under the age of 18, 5.9%  from 18 to 24, 25.5%  from 25 to 44, 20.3%  from 45 to 64, and 17.0%  who were 65 or older. The median age was 35 years.  For every 100 females, there were 112.5 males.  For every 100 females age 18 and over, there were 105.9 males.

The median household income was $46,667 and the median family income was $46,667. Males had a median income of $33,750 versus $25,833 for females.

Notable people

 Jim Van Engelenhoven, Iowa State Representative

References

External links

City-Data Comprehensive Statistical Data and more about Leighton

Cities in Iowa
Cities in Mahaska County, Iowa